Narew  is a village in Hajnówka County, Podlaskie Voivodeship, in north-eastern Poland. It is the seat of the gmina (administrative district) called Gmina Narew.

The village has a population of 1,400.

History
Narew was founded in 1514. It lost its city status on May 24, 1934. During World War II the Nazis took local Jews out of the city and later killed them.

Demography
The most spoken languages in Narew according to the Russian Imperial Census of 1897:

References

Villages in Hajnówka County
Podlachian Voivodeship
Belsky Uyezd (Grodno Governorate)
Białystok Voivodeship (1919–1939)
Belastok Region